Claude Guimond (born August 4, 1963) is a Canadian politician, who was elected to represent the electoral district of Rimouski-Neigette—Témiscouata—Les Basques in the 2008 Canadian federal election and then defeated in the 2011 Canadian federal election. He served as a member of the Bloc Québécois.

External links

1963 births
Bloc Québécois MPs
French Quebecers
Living people
Members of the House of Commons of Canada from Quebec
People from Rimouski
21st-century Canadian politicians